The Order of the Red Cross (Serbian: Орден Црвеног крста) was a military decoration of the Kingdom of Serbia, Kingdom of Serbs, Croats and Slovenes and Kingdom of Yugoslavia. Established in 1876 and first awarded in 1877 by the Serbian Red Cross Society, it was awarded for exceptional care of the wounded and sick during war time. Decorations of the Serbian Red Cross Society had the rank of state decorations.

History and Criteria 
The Order of the Red Cross or Cross of the Serbian Red Cross Society was founded in 1877, It was first awarded during the Wars of Independence against the Ottomans Empire (1876-1878).

The Cross was awarded by the Board of the Red Cross Society, with the approval of the Chancellor of Royal Orders, for exceptional merit and services rendered to the Serbian Red Cross in time of war or peace, and for care and assistance to the sick and wounded, philanthropy and personal merit. The Order of the Red Cross was founded in a single Class.

After 1918 and the Proclamation of the Kingdom of Serbs, Croats and Slovenes, the Cross of the Serbian Red Cross Society became known as the Order of the Red Cross.

Appearance

Principality of Serbia 
The decoration was a cross-shaped silver breast badge with red enamel on both sides; the front features the Coat of arms of the Principality of Serbia and a crown with a metal loop at the top for attaching the ribbon. The reverse features the inscription: “1876”, date of the establishment of the Red Cross of Serbia.

The Cross was worn suspended from a tricolor ribbon

Kingdom of Serbia 
The appearance of the Cross was modified after the Proclamation of the Kingdom of Serbia in 1882, replacing the Coat of arms of the Principality of Serbia with the Coat of arms of the Kingdom of Serbia, it featured a crown with a metal loop at the top to attach the ribbon. The reverse had the same inscription as the first version: “1876”.

The Cross was worn suspended from a white ribbon when awarded for services during peacetime and white with red stripes on the edge for services during wartime.

Recipients 
 During the Serbo-Bulgarian 1885-86 war 477: (284 to foreigners).
 During the First and Second Balkan war as well as the First World War (up until 1921): 3135 (1807 to foreigners).
 From 1922 to 1936: 674 (145 to foreigners).

Images

See also 
 Red Cross Medal of Merit (Serbia)

References

Orders, decorations, and medals of the Principality of Serbia
Orders, decorations, and medals of the Kingdom of Serbia
Orders, decorations, and medals of the Kingdom of Yugoslavia
Awards established in 1877
Serbia
1870s establishments in Serbia
1877 establishments in the Ottoman Empire